Richard H. Kennington (1921 in Worcester, Massachusetts - September 10, 1999 in Annapolis, Maryland) was an American philosopher and professor of philosophy at Pennsylvania State University and the Catholic University of America. He is known for his research on early modern philosophy and his translation of Descartes' Discourse on the Method.

Books
 On Modern Origins: Essays in Early Modern Philosophy (Applications of Political Theory),  Pamela Kraus and Frank Hunt (eds), Lexington Books 2004, 
 Discourse on Method (Focus Philosophical Library), Translated by Richard Kennington; Edited, with Introduction and Notes, by Pamela Kraus and Frank Hunt, Focus Publishing 2007,

References

External links
 Kennington's papers

20th-century American philosophers
American translators
Political philosophers
Philosophy academics
Pennsylvania State University faculty
University of California alumni
The New School alumni
Catholic University of America faculty
1921 births
1999 deaths
Descartes scholars
20th-century translators